Eriorhynchus ramosus is a species in the genus Eriorhynchus.

References 

Animals described in 1997
Trombidiformes